UTS may refer to:

Computing
 Unicode Technical Standard
 Universal Time-Sharing System, an operating system for XDS Sigma  computers
 Amdahl UTS, a Unix operating system for  IBM-compatible mainframes

Science and mechanical

 Ultimate tensile strength of a material
 Unified Thread Standard for screws
 Untriseptium, an unsynthesized chemical element

Education
 Unification Theological Seminary of the Unification Church, New York, US
 Union Theological Seminary (Philippines), Protestant seminary
 Union Theological Seminary in the City of New York, US
 University of Technology Sydney, Australia
 University of Toronto Schools, Canada
 University Transit Service of the University of Virginia, US

Other uses
 Uts (river), a river in Belarus
 Huntsville Regional Airport in Huntsville, Texas (FAA ID)
 Underground Ticketing System, as used in London Underground ticketing
 Uner Tan syndrome
 Ultimate Tennis Showdown